Me and You and Everyone We Know is a 2005 American romantic comedy-drama film written and directed by Miranda July. She also acts in the starring role, opposite John Hawkes. The film was the first major studio production for July, who had been known previously for her self-produced short films and performance art.

Plot
The structure of the film consists of several subplots which all revolve around an intertwined cast of characters.

The film begins by introducing Richard (John Hawkes), a shoe salesman and recently separated father of two. After being thrown out by his wife Pam (JoNell Kennedy), he gets an apartment of his own to share with his children, Peter (Miles Thompson) and Robby (Brandon Ratcliff). He meets Christine (Miranda July), a senior-cab driver and amateur video artist, while she takes her client to shop for shoes, and the two develop a fledgling romantic relationship.

Robby, six years old, and his 14-year-old brother, Peter, have a joint online chat, which he later depicts in another chat session as "))<>((", an emoticon that means "pooping back and forth, forever." This piques the interest of the woman at the other end and she suggests a face-to-face meeting. When Robby and the woman meet at a park, she realizes he's a child and kisses him and walks away.

Two of Richard's teenaged neighbors, Heather (Natasha Slayton) and Rebecca (Najarra Townsend), develop a playful relationship with a much older neighbor Andrew (Brad William Henke) who works in the shoe store with Richard. He does not say much, but he keeps leaving signs on his window about what he would do to each of them. As a result of this relationship, Heather and Rebecca ask Peter if they can practice oral sex on him, so that he can tell them which of the two does it better; so they do. He says both were exactly the same. The daughter of a neighbor peeks in the window, sees what is happening, and quickly leaves. Heather and Rebecca later come to the neighbor's house intending to have sex with him as practice, but he appears afraid when he sees them through his window and he pretends not to be home.

Meanwhile, Christine's work is rejected by a contemporary art museum, but then later accepted by the curator, who turns out to be the woman who was instant messaging with the brothers.

The plots come together in the end, with Peter developing a friendship with the daughter of a neighbor, having been introduced to the hope chest that she has, Christine and Richard displaying a show of mutual acceptance of their attraction to each other, and, as a final plot device, Robby finding that the noise he had awoken to early every morning was that of an early-rising businessman tapping a quarter on a street sign pole. When asked why he is doing it, he stops and turns around, saying "just passing the time", and gives Robby the quarter. When his bus drives away and Robby tries it out himself, the sun heightens with each tap, time literally passing as he does it.

Cast
 Miranda July as Christine Jesperson
 John Hawkes as Richard Swersey
 Miles Thompson as Peter Swersey
 Brandon Ratcliff as Robby Swersey
 Natasha Slayton as Heather
 Najarra Townsend as Rebecca
 Carlie Westerman as Sylvie
 JoNell Kennedy as Pam
 Brad William Henke as Andrew
 Tracy Wright as Nancy Herrington
 Hector Elias as Michael
 Ellen Geer as Ellen
 Jordan Potter as Shamus
 Colette Kilroy and James Kayten as Sylvie's mom and dad

Production
The film was shot using a Sony HDW-F900 CineAlta high definition digital video camera.

The score, composed by Michael Andrews, was performed largely on a modified Casio SK-1 sampling keyboard.

On-line chat scenes were filmed with open-source Gaim software, now known as Pidgin.

Reception
The film received largely positive reviews; it currently holds an 82% rating on Rotten Tomatoes, with the consensus stating "Miranda July's debut feature is a charmingly offbeat and observant film about people looking for love." On Metacritic, Me and You holds a 76, indicating "Generally favorable reviews".

The film won the Caméra d'Or at the 2005 Cannes Film Festival.

Roger Ebert cited it as the fifth best film of the decade.

Peter Bradshaw for The Guardian stated in a negative review of this film: "It feels as if watching this will earn you credits on an American college discourse on emotional correctness."

Music
The soundtrack was released on July 12, 2005 with the following tracks.

References

External links
 
 
 
 
 
Me and You and Everyone We Know: Punk Cars Bodies Movies an essay by Sara Magenheimer at The Criterion Collection
Me and You and Everyone We Know: Performance Rites an essay by Lauren Groff at The Criterion Collection

2005 films
2005 independent films
2005 romantic comedy-drama films
2000s English-language films
American romantic comedy-drama films
American independent films
Film4 Productions films
Films directed by Miranda July
Films scored by Michael Andrews
Caméra d'Or winners
2005 directorial debut films
2005 comedy films
2005 drama films
2000s American films